dalwinder singh grewal-national athlete.                                

Bavanpreet singh-state athlete

Transport

National athlete dalwinder Singh grewal See also
List of villages in India

Bavanpreet Singh grewal -state athlete

External links
List of villages in Jalandhar district at Census of India, 2011

Villages in Jalandhar district